The 2008 Women's County One-Day Championship was the 12th cricket Women's County Championship season. It ran from May to August and saw 31 county teams and teams representing Scotland and Wales compete in a series of divisions. Sussex Women won the County Championship as winners of the top division, achieving their fourth title.

Competition format 
Teams played matches within a series of divisions with the winners of the top division being crowned County Champions. Matches were played using a one day format with 50 overs per side.

The championship works on a points system with positions within the divisions being based on the total points. Points were awarded as follows:

Win: 20 points. 
Tie:  16 points. 
Loss: Bonus points.
Abandoned or No Result: 6 points.
Cancelled No Play: 10 points.

Up to four batting and four bowling points were available to the losing side only, or both sides in an incomplete match.

Teams
The 2008 Championship was divided into five divisions: Divisions One to Four with four teams apiece and Division Five with 17 teams split across four regional groups.

Teams in the top four Divisions played each other twice, and teams in Division Five played each other once.

Division One 

Source: ECB Women's County Championship

Division Two 

Source: ECB Women's County Championship

Division Three 

Source: ECB Women's County Championship

Division Four 

Source: ECB Women's County Championship

Division Five 
Due to restructuring of the Championship to expand the number of teams per division in 2009, the winners of the Division Five groups went into a play-off to determine promotion: the top two were promoted to Division Three, whilst the bottom two would form Division Four along with the four second-placed Division Five teams.

London & East 

Source: ECB Women's County Championship

Midlands 

Source: ECB Women's County Championship

North 

Source: ECB Women's County Championship

South & West 

Source: ECB Women's County Championship

Play-off 

Source: ECB Women's County Championship

Statistics

Most runs

Source: CricketArchive

Most wickets

Source: CricketArchive

Notes

References

2008
cricket
cricket